Baltar is a parish in Paredes Municipality in Portugal. The population in 2011 was 4,818, in an area of 7.41 km².

References

Freguesias of Paredes, Portugal